Bocha was a chiefdom in Zimbabwe. It was founded some time before 1750. It became a part of the British Mashonaland protectorate in 1889.

References

History of Zimbabwe